The Story of G.I. Joe, also credited in prints as Ernie Pyle's Story of G.I. Joe, is a 1945 American war film directed by William A. Wellman, starring Burgess Meredith and Robert Mitchum. The film was nominated for four Academy Awards, including Mitchum's only Oscar nomination which was for Best Supporting Actor. This was the film that established him as one of the world's biggest movie stars.

The story is a tribute to the American infantryman ("G.I. Joe") during World War II, told through the eyes of Pulitzer Prize-winning war correspondent Ernie Pyle, with dialogue and narration lifted from Pyle's columns. The film concentrates on one company, ("C Company, 18th Infantry"), that Pyle accompanies into combat in Tunisia and Italy. The friendships that grow out of his coverage led Pyle to relate the misery and sacrifice inherent in their plight and their heroic endurance of it. Although the company has the designation of an actual unit, that unit did not participate in the combat in Italy that makes up the preponderance of the film, and actually stands in for the units of the 34th and 36th Infantry Divisions that Pyle did cover in Italy.

Although filmed with the cooperation of Pyle, the film premiered two months to the day after he was killed in action on Ie Shima during the invasion of Okinawa. In his February 14, 1945, posting titled "In the Movies", Pyle commented: "They are still calling it The Story of G.I. Joe. I never did like the title, but nobody could think of a better one, and I was too lazy to try." In 2009, it was named to the National Film Registry by the Library of Congress for being "culturally, historically or aesthetically" significant and will be preserved for all time.

Plot
The untested infantrymen of C Company, 18th Infantry, U.S. Army, board trucks to travel to the front for the first time. Lt. Bill Walker allows war correspondent Ernie Pyle, himself a rookie to combat, to hitch a ride with the company. Ernie surprises Walker and the rest of the men by deciding to go with them all the way to the front lines. Just getting to the front through the rain and mud is an arduous task, but the diminutive, forty-two-year-old Ernie manages to keep up.

Ernie gets to know the men whose paths he will cross and write about again and again in the next year:
 Private Robert "Wingless" Murphy, a good-natured man who was rejected by the Air Corps for being too tall;
 Private Dondaro, an Italian-American from Brooklyn whose mind is always on women and conniving to be with one;
 Sergeant Warnicki, who misses the young son ("Junior") he has never seen;
 Private Mew, from Brownsville, Texas, who has no family back home but finds one in the outfit, exemplified by his naming beneficiaries for his G.I. life insurance among them.

Their "baptism of fire" is at the Battle of Kasserine Pass, a bloody chaotic defeat. Ernie is present at battalion headquarters when Lieutenant Walker arrives as a runner for his company commander; Walker has already become an always tired, seemingly emotionless, and grimy soldier. Ernie and the company go their separate ways, but months later he seeks them out, confessing that, as the first outfit he ever covered, they are in his mind the best outfit in the army. He finds them on a road in Italy, about to attack a German-held town, just as the soldiers are elated or disappointed at "mail call": letters for Murphy and Dondaro, a package with a phonograph record of his son's voice for Warnicki, but nothing for now Captain Walker. Ernie finds that Company C has become very proficient at killing without remorse. In house-to-house combat, they capture the town. Fatigue, however, is an always present but never conquerable enemy. When arrangements are made for Wingless Murphy to marry "Red", his Army nurse fiancée, in the town they have just captured, Ernie is recruited to give the bride away, but can barely keep awake.

The company advances to a position in front of Monte Cassino, but, unable to advance, they are soon reduced to a life of living in caves dug in the ground, enduring persistent rain and mud, conducting endless patrols and subjected to savage artillery barrages. When his men are forced to eat cold rations for Christmas dinner, Walker obtains turkey and cranberry sauce for them from a rear echelon supply lieutenant at gunpoint. Casualties are heavy: young replacements are quickly killed before they can learn the tricks of survival in combat (which Walker confesses to Ernie makes him feel like a murderer), Walker is always short of lieutenants, and the veterans lose men, including Wingless Murphy. After a night patrol to capture a prisoner, Warnicki suffers a nervous breakdown when, finally hearing his son's voice on the record, his pent up frustrations at the war are released. Walker sadly directs the others to subdue the hysterical sergeant and sends him to the infirmary. Ernie returns to the correspondents' quarters to write a piece on Murphy's death and is told by his fellow reporters that he has won the Pulitzer Prize for his combat reporting. Ernie again catches up with the outfit on the side of the road to Rome after Cassino has finally been taken. He greets Mew and a few of the old hands, but the pleasant reunion is interrupted when a string of mules is led into their midst, each carrying the dead body of a G.I. to be gently placed on the ground. A final mule, led by Dondaro, bears the body of Captain Walker. One by one, the old hands reluctantly come forth to express their grief in the presence of Walker's corpse.

"Then the first man squatted down, and he reached down and took the dead hand, and he sat there for a full five minutes, holding the dead hand in his own and looking intently into the dead face, and he never uttered a sound all the time he sat there. And finally he put the hand down, and then reached up and gently straightened the points of the captain's shirt collar, and then he sort of rearranged the tattered edges of his uniform around the wound. And then he got up and walked away down the road, all alone."

Ernie joins the company as it goes down the road, narrating its conclusion: "For those beneath the wooden crosses, there is nothing we can do, except perhaps to pause and murmur, 'Thanks pal, thanks.'"

Cast
 Burgess Meredith as Ernie Pyle
 Robert Mitchum as Lt./Capt. Bill Walker
 Freddie Steele as Sgt. Steve Warnicki
 Wally Cassell as Pvt. Dondaro
 Jimmy Lloyd as Pvt. Spencer
 John R. Reilly as Pvt. Robert 'Wingless' Murphy
 William Murphy as Pvt. Charles R. Mew
 Dorothy Coonan Wellman as Nurse Lt. Elizabeth 'Red' Murphy (uncredited) 
 Sicily and Italy Combat Veterans of the Campaigns in Africa as Themselves

Casting notes
Casting of the role of Ernie Pyle began in June 1944, after speculation about the role brought forth a large number of names as possibilities to producer Lester Cowan. Pyle was seen by Americans as part saint, part seer, and part common man, and himself pleaded with a fellow correspondent, headed to Hollywood to contribute to the storyline: "For God's sake, don't let them make me look like a fool." The choice narrowed down quickly to three character actors resembling Pyle or his perceived persona: James Gleason, Walter Brennan, and Meredith, who was then little-known and serving as a captain in the Army. Meredith was chosen because he was lesser known. Cowan was advised that if Capt. Meredith appeared in the film, all profits would have to be donated to the Army Emergency Relief Fund, and the Army refused to release him from active duty. According to Meredith, the Army was overruled by presidential advisor Harry Hopkins, and his honorable discharge from the Army was approved personally by General George C. Marshall. Meredith himself spent time with Pyle while the correspondent recuperated in New Mexico from the emotional after-effects of surviving an accidental bombing by the Army Air Forces at the start of Operation Cobra in Normandy. Pyle approved of the casting of Meredith, and said that he believed the actor to be the best choice after the death of British Actor Leslie Howard in a plane crash.

The movie studio initially wanted to place a leading-man type for the main role, but Wellman wanted a physically smaller man to better portray middle-aged Pyle. As a compromise, Mitchum was chosen to play Lieutenant (later Captain) Walker. The film was one of the first starring roles for Mitchum.

Nine actual war correspondents are listed as "For the War Correspondents" in technical advisor credits: Don Whitehead (Associated Press), George Lait (International News Service), Chris Cunningham (United Press), Hal Boyle (A.P.), Jack Foisie (Stars and Stripes), Bob Landry (Life magazine), Lucien Hubbard (Reader's Digest), Clete Roberts (Blue Network), and Robert Reuben (Reuters). Three appear as themselves in the scene in which Ernie learns he has won the Pulitzer Prize.

Wellman's wife, actress Dorothy Coonan Wellman, appeared in an uncredited speaking role as Lt. Elizabeth "Red" Murphy, the combat zone bride of character "Wingless" Murphy.

The Army agreed to Wellman's request for 150 soldiers, then training in California for further deployment to the Pacific and all veterans of the Italian campaign, to use as extras during the six weeks of filming in late 1944. Their training continued when they were not filming to present the best image possible for the Army, although the War Department allowed them to grow beards for their roles. Wellman insisted that actual soldiers speak much of the "G.I." dialogue for authenticity. He also insisted that the Hollywood actors ("as few as possible") cast in the film be required to live and train with the assigned soldiers or they would not be hired.

Preservation
The Academy Film Archive preserved G.I. Joe in 2000.

Concept

Screenplay
The film's concept originated with Lester Cowan, an independent producer, in September 1943, when he approached the War Department for cooperation in making a movie about the infantry with the same high degree of prestige as Air Force. In October he came to terms with United Artists for financial support and distribution of the proposed film, then developed a story outline based on Pyle's columns reproduced in Here is Your War, which the Army approved on November 27.

Attempts to write a script that would accurately translate Pyle's style and sentiments to the screen while being acceptable to all of Pyle's readers and fans delayed filming for a year. Cowan came up with his final concept—Pyle's "love affair" with the ordinary infantryman—by June 1944, but developing a storyline proved more difficult. After the D-Day Invasion of Normandy, believing that the end of the war was in sight, the script moved in the direction of Pyle covering the infantry in its final advance to victory.

However the final form of the screenplay developed through the input of several war correspondents and associates of Pyle, chiefly Don Whitehead, Lee Miller, and Paige Cavanaugh, who assisted the writers in selecting details from Pyle's columns for inclusion in the film, and from the desires of director William Wellman, who worked directly with Pyle.

Finding a director
Cowan's first choice for director was John Huston, even though he had completed only two films before going into the service. Cowan was impressed by two feature combat documentaries Huston had made for the war effort, Report from the Aleutians and The Battle of San Pietro, but was unable to gain Huston's services from the Army.

In August 1944, unable to complete the writing of the screenplay, Cowan sought the services of William A. Wellman. One film history has Cowan walking into Wellman's home uninvited, making a strong pitch for Wellman's services, then engaging in a heated argument when Wellman refused. Wellman told Cowan that he "hated the infantry" because of his own experiences as a fighter pilot in World War I, and because the infantry commander assigned by the War Department to assist in the making of Wellman's acclaimed Wings in 1927 so disliked the Air Corps that he had attempted to renege on the cooperation and obstruct the filming.

Cowan made two other attempts to cajole Wellman into accepting the assignment, first by bringing a personal letter from Pyle to Wellman (who was quoted as saying it was "like waving a red flag in front of a bull" and resulted in Wellman's slamming the door on Cowan), and by bribing Wellman with gifts for his children. The latter resulted in Wellman threatening Cowan if he came back again.

Cowan persisted, however, and had Ernie Pyle (who had returned to Albuquerque for a rest from combat) personally telephone Wellman. Pyle overcame Wellman's resistance by inviting him to his home where two days of discussions resulted in a complete change of heart by Wellman. Suid goes on to note that although Wellman was dictatorial in his management of the filming and crucial to the style and final form of the script, that Wellman's greatest impact was as the "catalyst" for the "collaborative process" (as opposed to the more modern philosophy of filmmaking as a "director's medium") of bringing together "Pyle, his stories, the actors, and the Army to create a uniquely realistic movie."

Historical basis
Pyle covered the 1st Infantry Division, including the 18th Infantry, in Tunisia from January to May 1943, and wrote a column on the American defeat at Kasserine Pass. He also landed with the 1st Division during the invasion of Sicily in July 1943. However, after the Sicilian campaign, which is mentioned but not portrayed in the film, the 18th Infantry moved to England to prepare for the Allied invasion of France, while the film's "Company C" is said to have made a landing under fire at Salerno.

While the screenwriters chose the 18th Infantry Regiment to be depicted in the film, Pyle made clear that his favorite outfit, "my company", was in the 133rd Infantry Regiment (originally part of the Iowa National Guard) of the 34th Infantry Division, a unit he had covered in 1942 while it was still stationed in Northern Ireland, then again in Tunisia. Pyle devotes Chapter Thirteen, "The Fabulous Infantry", of his book Brave Men to this unnamed company of the 133rd Infantry, which he accompanied between December 1943 and February 1944, concentrating on eight G.I.s who were the last survivors of the original 200 shipped to Europe. The chapter's vignettes are very similar to the final form of the film, including portrayal of the well-liked and competent company commander, 1st Lt. John J. "Jack" Sheehy. At least three characters were based on subjects in this outfit, including Sgt. Warnicki (Sgt. Jack Pierson, who also had never seen his son "Junior") and the company's mascot dog, in this instance a small black-and-white female named "Squirt".

The events in Italy portrayed in the film are based on Pyle's experiences with soldiers of the 36th Infantry Division in the Battle of San Pietro, and the 133rd Infantry in the Battle of Monte Cassino. Mitchum's character, Capt. Bill Walker, was modeled on two soldiers who deeply impressed Pyle. Walker was a stand-in for Capt. Henry T. Waskow of the 36th Division's Company B 143rd Infantry, and the vehicle for conveying the reflections expressed to Pyle by Sgt. Frank Eversole of the 133rd Infantry. Walker's death—and the reaction of his men to it—is a faithful recreation of the death of Waskow on Hill 1205 (Monte Sammucro) on December 14, 1943, which was the subject of Pyle's most famous column, The Death of Captain Waskow. Sgt. "Buck" Eversole was a platoon leader in Lt. Sheehy's company and the subject of several Pyle stories.

Riley Tidwell was involved in the movie made about G.I. Joe. After his discharge in 1945, he toured with Robert Mitchum and the movie cast. The movie tells Captain Waskow's story in which Ernie Pyle pictures Tidwell as G.I. Joe

Awards and nominations

Academy Award nominations
 Best Supporting Actor - Robert Mitchum
 Best Original Song - Ann Ronell for "Linda"
 Best Score - Louis Applebaum and Ann Ronell
 Best Screenplay - Leopold Atlas, Guy Endore, and Philip Stevenson

References

External links
The Story of G.I. Joe essay  by Amy Dunkleberger at National Film Registry
 
 
 
 
 "The Death of Captain Waskow" reprinted at the Indiana University School of Journalism
 Photos of Ernie Pyle from Story of G.I. Joe 1944 by Ned Scott
 The Story of G.I. Joe essay by Daniel Eagan In America's Film Legacy, 2009-2010: A Viewer's Guide To The 50 Landmark Movies Added To The National Film Registry In 2009–10, Bloomsbury Publishing USA, 2011,  pages 

1945 films
1940s war films
1940s biographical films
American biographical films
American black-and-white films
American war films
Battle of Monte Cassino
Films about journalists
1940s English-language films
Films scored by Louis Applebaum
Films directed by William A. Wellman
Italian Campaign of World War II films
United Artists films
United States National Film Registry films
World War II films made in wartime
World War II films based on actual events